The London and North Eastern Railway (LNER) Thompson Class O1 was a class of 2-8-0 steam locomotive designed by Edward Thompson for freight work. None have survived to preservation.

Construction
Because of wartime restrictions on new-build locomotives, they were rebuilds of LNER Class O4 "ROD" 2-8-0s built before and during World War I, although most of the locomotive was replaced during this rebuild.  The first LNER rebuild took place in February 1944, at Gorton Works  and a total of 58 locomotives were rebuilt to class O1 in total, with the last being locomotive 63856 in October 1949 during the early British Railways era, after which the programme was halted. The main modification to the original  GCR Robinson Class 8K 2-8-0 design was the incorporation of a standard LNER 100A boiler, Walschaerts valve gear and new cylinders. The locomotives kept the same numbers those being locomotives 3571, 3578-3579, 3589, 3592, 3596, 3596, 3610, 3619, 3630, 3646, 3650, 3652, 3663, 3670, 3676, 3678, 3687, 3689, 3711-3712, 3725, 3740, 3746, 3752, 3755, 3760, 3768, 3773, 3777, 3780, 3784, 3786, 3789, 3792, 3795-3796, 3803, 3806, 3808, 3817, 3838, 3854, 3856, 3863, 3865, 3867-3869, 3872, 3874, 3879, 3886-3887, 3890 and 3901.

British Railways
The locomotives passed to British Railways (BR) Eastern and North Eastern Regions on 1 January 1948 and were given BR running numbers in the range 63570-63920. However, this range included many unrebuilt O4s.

Preservation
None of the Thompson O1s have been secured for preservation.

Models
Hornby make models of the O1s in OO gauge.

References

External links 

 The Thompson O1 2-8-0 Locomotives LNER encyclopedia
 Class O1 Details at Rail UK

O1 Thompson
2-8-0 locomotives
Railway locomotives introduced in 1944
Scrapped locomotives
Standard gauge steam locomotives of Great Britain
1′D h2 locomotives
Freight locomotives